The Shoro company is a beverage company in Kyrgyzstan.  They sell four national beverages: Maksym Shoro, Chalap Shoro, Jarma Shoro, and Aralash Shoro.  These beverages are the traditional drinks maksym, chalap, jarma, and a mix of the former two, respectively.  These can be bought in bottles in a majority of stores, or "on tap" on street corners (see picture) and at bazaars in most cities in Kyrgyzstan.  Additionally, they sell bottled carbonated water, marketing it as "Байтик".

Their primary competitor is Enesay, which produces similar beverages and distributes them in similar ways.

References

External links 
 Shoro's website

Food and drink companies of Kyrgyzstan